The 2006 Women's Six Nations Championship, also known as the 2006 RBS Women's 6 Nations due to the tournament's sponsorship by the Royal Bank of Scotland, was the fifth series of the rugby union Women's Six Nations Championship and was won by , who achieved the Grand Slam. This was the last Six Nations in which Spain took part - Italy were to replace them in 2007.

Final table

Results

Leading points scorers

See also
Women's Six Nations Championship
Women's international rugby

References

External links
The official RBS Six Nations Site

2006
2005–06 in Irish rugby union
2005–06 in English rugby union
2005–06 in Welsh rugby union
2005–06 in Scottish rugby union
2005–06 in French rugby union
2005–06 in European women's rugby union
rugby union
rugby union
rugby union
rugby union
2005–06 in Spanish rugby union
International women's rugby union competitions hosted by Spain
Women
rugby union
rugby union
Women's Six Nations
Women's Six Nations